Abū 'Uthmān Sa'īd Bin Salām Al-Maghrībī (مغربی) was an Egyptian Sufi scholar of the Kubruwi Order. He was instructed in Sufism by Abū 'Alī al-Katib. He died in 983 (373 AH) and was buried in Neshabur, Iran. He would have been born in 857, so he would have lived to 130 years old.

References

External links

Egyptian Sufis
Iranian Muslim mystics